NWA Hollywood Wrestling (sometimes referred to as NWA Los Angeles) was a professional wrestling promotion headquartered in Los Angeles, California in the United States that promoted professional wrestling matches throughout Southern California. It was founded in 1958 as the North American Wrestling Alliance, a member of the National Wrestling Alliance. It broke away from the NWA in 1959 and was renamed Worldwide Wrestling Associates in 1961. In 1968, it rejoined the NWA and adopted its final name, remaining a member until closing in 1982.

History
In 1942, Frank Garbutt, vice president of the Los Angeles Athletic Club, hired former California State Athletic Commission inspector Alvah "Cal" Eaton as the promoter of the Grand Olympic Auditorium at the advice of his secretary, Aileen LeBell. Eaton and LeBell married in 1948, and over the following years the couple became major professional wrestling and boxing promoters in Southern California. By the early-1950s, the Eatons, along with Hugh Nichols, Johnny Doyle, and Mike Hirsch (collectively known as the "California Combine"), dominated professional wrestling in Southern California, leading to a United States Department of Justice antitrust investigation in 1955 and 1956.

On July 24, 1957, Lou Thesz defeated Édouard Carpentier under controversial circumstances to win the NWA World Heavyweight Championship, the principal championship recognized by the National Wrestling Alliance. The decision was challenged by some members of the National Wrestling Alliance who continued to recognize Carpentier as World Heavyweight Champion.

In 1958, the Eatons created the North American Wrestling Alliance as a new vehicle for promoting professional wrestling in Los Angeles. Eaton at the time was still a member of the National Wrestling Alliance, the national league that dominated professional wrestling in the United States, but had not paid dues since 1955. In October 1959, Eaton and LeBell withdrew from the NWA, recognizing Carpentier as the inaugural World Heavyweight Champion backdated to June 14, 1957, when Carpentier had originally won the NWA World Heavyweight Championship. The promotion was renamed Worldwide Wrestling Associates in 1961.

The promotion ran events throughout Southern California, with the Grand Olympic Auditorium as its base. Bookers included Jules Strongbow, Freddie Blassie, Mr. Moto, and Gory Guerrero. The promotion developed a working relationship with the Japan Wrestling Association and New Japan Pro-Wrestling, resulting in many talent exchanges. Aileen Eaton introduced a system of paying wrestlers a proportion of the gate rather than a guaranteed fee, boosting profits and encouraging wrestlers to help promote the events. The promotion also pioneered the use of closed-circuit television to show matches to fans who were unable to secure tickets for live events, an early precursor to the pay-per-view model that emerged in the 1980s.

In 1963, WWA World Heavyweight Champion Bearcat Wright faced Freddie Blassie in a bout that Wright was scripted to lose. Instead, Wright headbutted Blassie, dazing him, and then legitimately pinned him. Wright was subsequently stripped of the championship which was then awarded to Edouard Carpentier.

Eaton died on January 10, 1966, with Aileen's son from a prior marriage Mike LeBell taking over on behalf of his mother, who by then was a major figure in boxing. On August 18, 1968, LeBell rejoined the NWA, renaming the promotion NWA Hollywood Wrestling. The WWA World Heavyweight Championship was abandoned and the promotion began recognizing the NWA World Heavyweight Championship once more.

In August 1971, the promotion set a national gate record for an event headed by a bout between Blassie and John Tolos that sold $142,158 worth of tickets.

In its last years, the promotion obtained a legacy of sorts by being the first recipient of the Wrestling Observer Newsletter award for Most Disgusting Promotional Tactic. This tactic involved the push of Tony Hernandez, who had previously wrestled in the Arizona territory as "Frankenstein", a crazed man who believed himself to be Frankenstein's monster and even wore a rubber mask depicting the creature. LeBell chose instead to push him as "The Monster", who was billed as legitimately being made in a laboratory, and use him as a top heel. After being defeated by Andre the Giant (who was reportedly unimpressed by the act and decided to stiff Hernandez), the Monster was unmasked - despite the mask being intended to be his real face - and turned into a child-friendly babyface. This entire arc was seen as insulting by hardcore fans.

NWA Hollywood Wrestling continued to operate until folding on December 26, 1982. In March 1983, the World Wrestling Federation began promoting shows in its former territory.

Championships

Alumni
Chris Adams
Buddy Austin
Freddie Blassie
Lord James Blears
Dino Bravo
Édouard Carpentier
The Destroyer
Ric Drasin
Terry Funk
Billy Graham
Chavo Guerrero, Sr.
Dick Lane (announcer)
Gene LeBell
Don Leo Jonathan
Mil Máscaras
Ray Mendoza
Pedro Morales
Mr. Moto
Roddy Piper
Rikidōzan
Victor Rivera
The Sheik
Dennis Stamp
Sándor Szabó
Lou Thesz
John Tolos
Dale Valentine
Bearcat Wright

Footnotes

See also
Championship Wrestling from Hollywood, brief local NWA revival in the 2010s, still running as an unaffiliated promotion

External links
Worldwide Wrestling Associates at WrestlingTitles.com
NWA Hollywood Documentary

 
1958 establishments in California
1982 disestablishments in the United States
Independent professional wrestling promotions based in California
Professional wrestling in Los Angeles